The Women's super combined competition of the 2014 Winter Paralympics was held at Rosa Khutor Alpine Resort near Krasnaya Polyana, Russia. The slalom portion of the race was held on 11 March 2014 and poor conditions pushed the Super-G portion of the race to 14 March 2014, reversing the usual order in which the two parts are contested.

Medal table

Visually impaired
In the visually impaired giant slalom, the athlete with a visual impairment has a sighted guide. The two skiers are considered a team, and dual medals are awarded.

Sitting

Standing

See also
Alpine skiing at the 2014 Winter Olympics

References

Women's combined
Para